Jerry Boys is a classically trained British record producer, and engineer, noted for his works with The Beatles, Omara Portuondo, Pink Floyd, Ibrahim Ferrer, The Kronos Quartet, Everything but the Girl, The Shadows, John Lee Hooker, Richard Thompson, The Rolling Stones, Ali Farka Touré, Steeleye Span, Shakira, R.E.M, Buena Vista Social Club, Sandy Denny, Olivia Chaney, Toumani Diabaté, Shirley Collins, Yehudi Menuhin, Orchestra Baobab, Manfred Mann, Level 42, and Ry Cooder. 

He started his career in 1965 at Abbey Road Studios when he was 17 years old, and is a four-time Grammy Award winner, and three-time nominee. Boys also worked at Olympic Studios, Livingston Recording Studios, EGREM and Sawmills Studios in Cornwall, England.

Grammy Awards and nominations

BAFTA Awards and nominations

References

External links 
 Jerry Boys Credits at AllMusic
 Official website

Living people
Record producers